The discography of the South Korean girl group April consists of seven extended plays, four single albums, and eleven singles. APRIL was formed by DSP Media in 2015, and is currently composed of six members: Chaekyung, Chaewon, Naeun, Yena, Rachel and Jinsol.

The group's debut extended play, Dreaming was released on August 24, 2015 along with the lead single, "Dream Candy" . The group made its Japanese debut on April 25, 2018, with the Japanese version of their 2016 single "Tinkerbell".

Albums

Single albums

Extended plays

Singles

Promotional singles

Soundtrack appearances

Other album appearances

Other charted songs

Videography

Music videos

Footnotes

References

Discography
Discographies of South Korean artists
K-pop music group discographies